, other romanizations include  Ōnishi, Ohnishi, and Oonishi with long vowel ō, is a Japanese surname or a Japanese place name.
 with short vowel o, is a Japanese surname.
 with short vowel o, is a Japanese place name. 

It may refer to:

With long vowel ō

People
Norimitsu Onishi (大西 哲光), Canadian journalist
Koji Onishi (大西 孝治, born 1988), Japanese footballer
Mitsugu Ōnishi (大西みつぐ, born 1952), Japanese photographer
Yuka Onishi (大西結花, born 1968) Japanese actress and idol singer, known for her role in the TV series Sukeban Deka III
Takijirō Ōnishi (大西 瀧治郎, 1891–1945), admiral in the Imperial Japanese Navy, known as the father of the kamikaze
Junko Onishi (swimmer) (大西 順子, born 1974), swimmer from Japan, won a bronze medal at the 2000 Summer Olympics
Junko Onishi (musician) (大西 順子, born 1967), Japanese post-bop jazz pianist
Takashi Onishi (大西 貴, born 1971), Japanese football player
Onishi Tetsunosuke (大西鐡之祐) 1916-1995), professor and coach of the Japan national rugby union team
Kazumi Onishi (大西 一美, born 1948), Japanese figure skater
Masayuki Onishi (大西 昌之, born 1977) Japanese football player
Tadao Onishi (大西 忠生, 1943–2006) Japanese football player
Yohei Onishi (大西 容平, born 1982), Japanese football player
Takuya Onishi (大西 卓哉, born 1975), Japanese astronaut
Yoshiaki Onishi (大西 義明, born 1981) composer, conductor, and clarinetist
, Japanese rower
, Japanese footballer
Yuki Onishi (chef)
Hiroshi Ōnishi (大西 博, 1961–2011), Japanese painter and University professor
Ai Haruna (born 1972 as Kenji Ōnishi (大西 賢示)), Japanese transsexual TV personality and singer

Places
Ōnishi, Ehime (大西町), Japan
Ōnishi Station (大西駅), a railway station in Imabari, Japan

Other uses
 9062 Ohnishi, asteroid

With short vowel o

People

Places
Onishi, Gunma (鬼石町), Japan

Japanese-language surnames